Railway stations in Oman include

Maps 
 UN Map

Under construction 
( all  gauge) 
 Al Ain - border with UAE
 Hafeet - junction
 Dhank
 Ibri
 Fahud
 Quam Alalam
 Bulk Terminal
 Haima - junction for Al Duqm
 Amal
 Marmul, Oman
 Thumrait - junction for Salalah
 Mazyunah - near border with Yemen

 Hafeet - junction
 Al Buraimi
 Sohar
 Khatmat
 Al Misfah
 Sinaw
 Ibra - mine

See also 

 Transport in Oman

References

External links

 
Railway stations
Oman
Railway stations